The 1989 season was the Hawthorn Football Club's 65th season in the Victorian Football League and 88th overall. Hawthorn entered the season as the defending VFL Premiers

Fixture

Premiership season

Finals series

Ladder

References

Hawthorn Football Club seasons